Peter Spiegelman (born 1958) is an American crime fiction author and former Wall Street executive. He is most known for his series of books following the cases of the Manhattan-based private eye, John March, winning a Shamus Award for the first novel in the series. He lives with his family in Connecticut.

Biography
Spiegelman grew up in Forest Hills, Queens and, creating his own home made superhero comic books, was interested in writing from a young age. He attended boarding school and studied English as an undergraduate at Vassar College, New York, winning the Beatrice Daw Brown prize for "a member of the senior class who has demonstrated excellence in the composition of poetry".

Spiegelman then "sobered up and realized I had to pay the rent" and worked for twenty years in the financial services industry; starting out as a computer programmer for a small consulting firm and ending up as a vice president of J.P. Morgan. He followed this by becoming a junior partner for The Frustum Group, a company that sold computer software to large financial institutions, until, in 2001, it was sold for "a "high eight-figure" sum" allowing him the financial freedom to return to writing. Speaking about his time on the trading floor, Spiegelman stated that "it's a great place to study dysfunctional egos and uncompromising greed - great for an aspiring novelist. Wall Street is such a 'noirish' place."

He was influenced by  Dashiell Hammett, Raymond Chandler, and Ross Macdonald.
He currently lives in Ridgefield, Connecticut, with his wife Alice Wang, a managing director at J. P. Morgan.

Bibliography

John March series
The series of books follows John March, an ex-deputy Sheriff and current Manhattan-based private eye. Spiegelman came up with the character "during his drives from Ridgefield" to his workplace in White Plains, New York.
 2003 Black Maps
 2005 Death's Little Helpers (aka No Way Home)
 2007 Red Cat (aka The Alibi League)
 2007 This Year's Model (short-story)
 2009 False Dawn

Standalone works
 2007 Wall Street Noir (short-story collection, editor)
 2011 Thick as Thieves
 2016 Dr. Knox: A Novel
 2022 A Secret About a Secret

Awards
His first novel, Black Maps, earned him the 2004 Shamus Award in the "Best First P. I. novel" category. The third novel of the John March series, Red Cat, was nominated for the 2008 Barry Award for "Best Novel". His fourth novel, Thick as Thieves, was recognised by Kirkus Reviews editor Elaine Szewczyk as one of the "Best Fiction [novels] of 2011".

References 

Living people
21st-century American novelists
American male novelists
American mystery writers
Shamus Award winners
1958 births
Novelists from Connecticut
Writers from New York City
 
Vassar College alumni
21st-century American male writers
Novelists from New York (state)